Tanjong Rhu is a subzone within the planning area of Kallang, Singapore, as defined by the Urban Redevelopment Authority (URA). The perimeter of Tanjong Rhu is made up of Nicoll Highway in the north; Mountbatten Road and Fort Road in the east; East Coast Parkway (ECP) in the south; as well as Marina Channel and Kallang Basin in the west. Tanjong Rhu is the largest in terms of physical area among the nine subzones that make up Kallang.

Consisting of residential, commercial and recreational developments, Tanjong Rhu is famous for being the location of the Singapore Sports Hub, which includes the Kallang Wave Mall, new National Stadium and the Singapore Indoor Stadium. Previously, the old National Stadium which hosted a total of 18 National Day Parades sat on the land now occupied by the new National Stadium. The former Kallang Airport once extended into this area, with part of its old runway being the modern-day Stadium Boulevard.

Other sports facilities in Tanjong Rhu include the Kallang Tennis Centre, Kallang Field, Kallang Ground, Kallang Track, Kallang Netball Centre, Kallang Squash Centre and PAssion WaVe @ Marina Bay. Notable places include Kallang Theatre, Leisure Park Kallang, Mountbatten Fire Post, Katong Community Centre, Singapore Swimming Club, the Benjamin Sheares Bridge and Dunman High School, one of Singapore's leading educational institutions.

Tanjong Rhu is currently served by two Mass Rapid Transit (MRT) stations on the Circle line: Stadium MRT station and Mountbatten MRT station. In 2023, two more stations along the Thomson–East Coast line will open: Tanjong Rhu MRT station and Katong Park MRT station.

Tanjong Rhu is an affluent residential neighbourhood, made up of mostly condominiums and private housing along Tanjong Rhu Road. A few blocks of public housing built by the Housing and Development Board (HDB) exist along Kampong Arang Road and Kampong Kayu Road. These residential estates are connected to the Singapore Sports Hub via Stadium Way, across the Geylang River.

Etymology

Tanjong Rhu is an old place name in Singapore that appeared in de Erédia's 1604 Map of Singapore, written as "Tanjon Rû".

This area was formerly known as Sandy Point. The Malay name comes from the casuarina trees, referred to in Malay as pokok rhu or ru, which is the casuarina littoria species that grew along the beach between Kallang and Rochor. It was known as sha tsui in Cantonese, which means "sand spit".

Condominiums

Costa Rhu
Pebble Bay
Fort Gardens
Water Place
Sanctuary Green
Parkshore
Tanjong Ria 
Camelot By The Water
Casuarina Cove
The Waterside
The Line @ Tanjong Rhu
Fulcrum
Crystal Rhu
La Ville

History
Tanjong Rhu has been associated with ship building and repairing from the early days. Captain William Flint, a harbour master, started a boat building and repair company here in 1822. Thomas Tivendale had his (Wilkinson, Tivendale and Company) shipyard here in the 1860s. The shipyard would be acquired by John I. Thornycroft & Company in 1926 and close in 1986 by successor Vosper Thornycroft Pte Singapore.

As late as the 1980s and the early 1990s, the Tanjong Rhu area was an industrial area with shipyards. The water surrounding Tanjong Rhu was polluted with industrial and domestic waste, creating an extremely unpleasant environment. A massive relocation exercise was then undertaken by the Singapore Government to transform Tanjong Rhu into a high-end residential area. Reclamation of land along the Tanjong Rhu coast began as early as 1992. Private developers then started the new luxury residential developments in Tanjong Rhu. Today, the shipyards have since been relocated elsewhere and condominiums have replaced them.

In September 1993, 12 men were arrested in an entrapment operation in Tanjong Rhu coined the "Fort Road Incident". They were charged with outrage of modesty. Six pleaded guilty. They were sentenced to three strokes of the cane each and imprisonment ranging from two to six months. The names, ages and occupations of all 12 men were published in all major Singaporean newspapers. Those were the last reported cases of such police entrapment. A short 19 minute 2009 film, "The Casuarina Cove" by Boo Junfeng told the story of one of those men.

References
Victor R Savage, Brenda S A Yeoh (2004), Toponymics - A Study of Singapore Street Names, Eastern University Press,

External links
The Changing Faces of Singapore - Tanjong Rhu
 TheLine@Tanjong Rhu

Places in Singapore
Central Region, Singapore
Kallang